Harold Lloyd Murphy (March 31, 1927 – December 28, 2022) was a United States district judge of the United States District Court for the Northern District of Georgia.

Education and career
Born in Haralson County, Georgia, on March 31, 1927, Murphy was in the United States Navy towards the end of World War II, from 1945 to 1946. He received a Bachelor of Laws from the University of Georgia School of Law in 1949, and was then in private practice in Buchanan, Georgia, until 1958, and in Buchanan and Tallapoosa, Georgia, until 1971. He was a Georgia state representative from 1951 to 1961. He was an assistant state solicitor general of the Tallapoosa Judicial Circuit in 1956. He was a Superior Court judge for the Tallapoosa Judicial Circuit, Georgia from 1971 to 1977.

Federal judicial service
On July 7, 1977, Murphy was nominated by President Jimmy Carter to a seat on the United States District Court for the Northern District of Georgia vacated by James Clinkscales Hill. Murphy was confirmed by the United States Senate on July 28, 1977, and received his commission on July 29, 1977. He assumed senior status on March 31, 2017.

Personal life and death 
Murphy died on December 28, 2022, at the age of 95.

References

Sources
 

1927 births
2022 deaths
20th-century American judges
21st-century American judges
Georgia (U.S. state) state court judges
Judges of the United States District Court for the Northern District of Georgia
Democratic Party members of the Georgia House of Representatives
Military personnel from Georgia (U.S. state)
People from Haralson County, Georgia
People from Tallapoosa, Georgia
Superior court judges in the United States
United States district court judges appointed by Jimmy Carter
United States Navy personnel of World War II
University of Georgia School of Law alumni